Hesperia (minor planet designation: 69 Hesperia) is a large, M-type main-belt asteroid. It was discovered by the Italian astronomer Giovanni Schiaparelli on April 29, 1861 from Milan, while he was searching for the recently discovered 63 Ausonia. It was his only asteroid discovery. Schiaparelli named it Hesperia in honour of Italy (the word is a Greek term for the peninsula). The orbital plane is inclined by an angle of 8.59° to the plane of the ecliptic.

Hesperia was observed by Arecibo radar in February 2010. The radar albedo is consistent with a high-metal M-type asteroid. In the near infrared, a weak absorption feature near a wavelength of 0.9 μm can be attributed to orthopyroxenes on the surface. A meteorite analogue of the reflectance spectra from 69 Hesperia is the Hoba ataxite.

References

External links 
 Bareket Observatory (Asteroid 69 Hesperia movie - through an Earth-based telescope.) 
 
 

Background asteroids
Hesperia
Hesperia
M-type asteroids (Tholen)
X-type asteroids (SMASS)
18610429